Deferred financing costs or debt issuance costs is an accounting concept meaning costs associated with issuing debt (loans and bonds), such as various fees and commissions paid to investment banks, law firms, auditors, regulators, and so on. Since these payments do not generate future benefits, they are treated as a contra debt account. The costs are capitalized, reflected in the balance sheet as a contra long-term liability, and amortized using the effective interest method or over the finite life of the underlying debt instrument, if below de minimus. The unamortized amounts are included in the long-term debt, as a reduction of the total debt (hence contra debt) in the accompanying consolidated balance sheets. Early debt repayment results in expensing these costs.

GAAP
Under U.S. GAAP, when issuing securities without specific maturity, such as perpetual preferred stock, financing costs reduce the amount of paid in capital associated with that security.

Tax treatment
For U.S. federal income tax purposes, DFC are generally amortized over the life of the debt using the straight-line method.

See also
 Deferred Tax
 Deferred Acquisition Costs

References

United States Generally Accepted Accounting Principles
Commercial bonds
Costs